Shah Nazar-e Mirian (also Romanized as Shāh Naẓar-e Mīrīān; also known as Shāhnaẓar-e Mīrīān) is a village in Kuhdasht-e Jonubi Rural District, in the Central District of Kuhdasht County, Lorestan Province, Iran. At the 2006 census, its population was 173, in 32 families.

References 

Towns and villages in Kuhdasht County